LatinWorks is an advertising agency headquartered in Austin, Texas, founded in 1998 by Manny Flores and Alejandro Ruelas, now rebranded as THIRD EAR.  Over its 23 year tenure in the marketing space, the agency has witnessed a lot of change. From a traditional approach with limited understanding of the market, to the current fast paced digital landscape — keeping up with well-known demographic changes and the cultural evolution of the country. The agency has always been at the forefront of these industry and societal transformations. They are, they represent and they speak the cultural realities of the new America. THIRD EAR is a certified minority enterprise and member of the Omnicom Global Network.

While known as LatinWorks, it was a nine-time Cannes Lions winner; a three-time Ad Age Multicultural Agency of the Year, in 2010, 2011, and 2012; and was featured twice on Ad Age's Agency A-List.

References

External links 
 LatinWorks

Advertising agencies of the United States